George is the third EP by Cartman. It was released October 7, 2002, by Embryo Records and distributed by MGM Distribution. The album contains a rendition of the Madonna hit "Justify My Love", as well as the videos for "Shock", "If I" and "Nobody".

Track listing
 "George" - 4:14 
 "Justify My Love" - 4:14 
 "Monday Afternoon" - 4:06 
 "Go!" Remix - 6:57 
 Video Clips - 13:24

Personnel
 Cain Turnley
 Joe Hawkins
 Scott Nicholls
 Ben Mills

References

Cartman (band) EPs
2002 EPs